Stylidium prophyllum is a dicotyledonous plant that belongs to the genus Stylidium (family Stylidiaceae). It is an annual plant that grows from 8 to 30 cm tall. The deltate leaves, about 4-10 per plant, are scattered along the elongate, glabrous stem and are generally 0.7-1.5 mm long and 0.3-0.6 mm wide. Petioles and scapes are absent. Inflorescences are 3–14 cm long and produce pink flowers that bloom from February to June in the southern hemisphere. S. prophyllum is endemic to the area in and around the Kimberley region in Western Australia. Its habitat is recorded as being "grassy floodplains, seepage areas, and waterways." S. prophyllum is most closely related to S. fissilobum but differs mostly in its glabrous sepals.

See also 
 List of Stylidium species

References 

Carnivorous plants of Australia
Eudicots of Western Australia
prophyllum
Asterales of Australia